Bioattack may refer to:

 Bio-Attack, a 1983 shoot-em-up by Taito
 Biological warfare, attack
 Bioterrorism attack, a terrorist attack using biological weapons
 A specific attack with bioweapons, see History of biological warfare

See also

 Bio (disambiguation)
 Attack (disambiguation)